Aignan is a commune in the Gers department in southwestern France.

Geography 
Aignan is located in the canton of Adour-Gersoise and in the arrondissement of Mirande.

Population

See also
 Communes of the Gers department

References

Communes of Gers